Genese Davis is an American video game writer and novelist, best known for her writing for games including Omensight, Ary and the Secret of Seasons, and Hogwarts Legacy, and as the author of the novel The Holder's Dominion. Davis is also a speaker and writer about video game culture and its development within society.

Biography
Davis grew up in Santa Fe, New Mexico. She attended the University of Texas, graduating with a Bachelor of Arts degree.

In 2013, Davis published her debut novel, The Holder's Dominion. A science fiction thriller about a female gamer fighting back against a malicious hacker who threatens the players of a massively multiplayer online game, the novel draws on Davis's experiences playing online games. Davis reportedly had trouble getting the book published due to its protagonist's gender, with two firms offering Davis publishing deals if she agreed to rewrite the book so the protagonist was a man; Davis declined these offers.

Davis was named the 2013 Woman of the Year by the "I Game Responsibly" staff for her positive promotion of video games and the video game industry.

In 2014, 2015 and 2016, Davis was a speaker at several Wizard World comic conventions, where she organized and participated in panel discussions.

Works

Novel
 2013, The Holder's Dominion,

Videography

References

External links 

Living people
21st-century American women writers
American fantasy writers
Women science fiction and fantasy writers
Writers from New Mexico
Writers from California
21st-century American novelists
American women novelists
American science fiction writers
Writers from Santa Fe, New Mexico
Women in the video game industry
Year of birth missing (living people)